Kalle Kaakko-oja (1 February 1875, Kuru - 7 May 1942) was a Finnish politician. He was a member of the Parliament of Finland from 1910 to 1913, representing the Finnish Party.

References

1875 births
1942 deaths
People from Ylöjärvi
People from Häme Province (Grand Duchy of Finland)
Finnish Party politicians
Members of the Parliament of Finland (1910–11)
Members of the Parliament of Finland (1911–13)